Sophronanthe  is a small genus of flowering plants in the Veronica family. The two included species are native to the Southeastern United States. These species were recently included in the genus Gratiola, but a study in 2008 showed that there are four distinct groups within Gratiola and resurrected the genus Sophronanthe.

There are two included species:
 Sophronanthe hispida Bentham ex Lindley – pineland hedge-hyssop
 Sophronanthe pilosa (Michaux) Small – shaggy hedge-hyssop

References

Plantaginaceae
Plantaginaceae genera
Flora of the Southeastern United States